Victoria is a 1972 Mexican drama film directed by José Luis Ibáñez and starring Julissa, Guillermo Murray and Enrique Álvarez Félix. It is an adaptation of Henry James' 1880 novel Washington Square.

Cast
 Julissa 
 Guillermo Murray 
 Enrique Álvarez Félix 
 Rita Macedo 
 Gilberto Román 
 Beatriz Sheridan 
 Helena Rojo 
 Rebeca Iturbide 
 Armando Sáenz 
 Silvia Mariscal 
 Octavio Ocampo 
 Arsenio Campos 
 Gloria Leticia Ortiz 
 Athenea Baker 
Cecilia Leger 
 Rocío Palacios  
 Ana Martín

References

Bibliography 
 Annick Duperray. The reception of Henry James in Europe. Continuum, 2006.

External links 
 

1972 films
1972 drama films
Mexican drama films
1970s Spanish-language films
Films based on works by Henry James
1970s Mexican films